Anthony Guzzo (born 1949) is an American baseball coach. He is an assistant baseball coach Old Dominion University in Norfolk, Virginia, a position he has held since 2017. Guzzo served as the head baseball coach at North Carolina Wesleyan University in Rocky Mount, North Carolina from 1979 to 1982, Virginia Commonwealth University (VCU) in Richmond, Virginia from 1983 to 1994, and Old Dominion from 1995 to 2004.

Career
Guzzo was raised in Elm City, North Carolina where he played high school baseball for Elm City High School, where he graduated in 1968. Upon graduation, Guzzo played college baseball for East Carolina Pirates, where he was a catcher during his four-year career. Upon graduation in 1972, Guzzo became the high school baseball coach for Norfolk Catholic High School in Norfolk, Virginia, before receiving his first head coaching job, with North Carolina Wesleyan University. Guzzo served as the head coach for NC Wesleyan from 1979 until 1982, where in the final two years, he helped NC Wesleyan reach the NCAA Division III College World Series. He finished with a 102–66 record at NC Wesleyan.

In August 1982, ahead of the 1983 NCAA Division I baseball season, Guzzo was hired by Virginia Commonwealth University to lead the baseball program. At VCU, he finished with a 329–300–1 record. After the 1994 season, he joined Old Dominion University as the head baseball coach. There he coached the program for 10 seasons. During his tenure, Old Dominion won two CAA regular season titles (1996, 2000), two CAA Tournament titles (1995, 1996) and earned three NCAA Regional appearances (1995, 1996, 2000). Notable players that Guzzo coached at Old Dominion included Justin Verlander, Kevin Gibbs, Matt Quatraro, Tim Hummel, and Ron Walker. After the 2004 season, Guzzo left Old Dominion and became an assistant coach for North Carolina State University.

After stints as an area scout for the Boston Red Sox, an assistant at Louisburg College, and high school coaching for Nash Central High School, Guzzo returned to Old Dominion in 2017 as an assistant coach.

References

External links
 
 Old Dominion profile
  

1949 births
Living people
Baseball catchers
East Carolina Pirates baseball coaches
East Carolina Pirates baseball players
Louisburg Hurricanes baseball coaches
NC State Wolfpack baseball coaches
North Carolina Wesleyan Battling Bishops baseball coaches
Old Dominion Monarchs baseball coaches
VCU Rams baseball coaches
High school baseball coaches in the United States
People from Wilson County, North Carolina
Baseball coaches from North Carolina
Baseball players from North Carolina